Françoise Nguele (born 30 September 1980) is a Cameroonian former judoka who competed in the 2000 Summer Olympics.

References

1980 births
Living people
Cameroonian female judoka
Olympic judoka of Cameroon
Judoka at the 2000 Summer Olympics
African Games medalists in judo
Competitors at the 1999 All-Africa Games
African Games gold medalists for Cameroon
21st-century Cameroonian women